In geometry, the infinite-order square tiling is a regular tiling of the hyperbolic plane. It has Schläfli symbol of {4,∞}. All vertices are ideal, located at "infinity", seen on the boundary of the Poincaré hyperbolic disk projection.

Uniform colorings
There is a half symmetry form, seen with alternating colors:

Symmetry
This tiling represents the mirror lines of *∞∞∞∞ symmetry. The dual to this tiling defines the fundamental domains of (*2∞) orbifold symmetry.

Related polyhedra and tiling 

This tiling is topologically related as a part of sequence of regular polyhedra and tilings with vertex figure (4n).

See also

Square tiling
Uniform tilings in hyperbolic plane
List of regular polytopes

References

External links 

 Hyperbolic and Spherical Tiling Gallery

Hyperbolic tilings
Infinite-order tilings
Isogonal tilings
Isohedral tilings
Regular tilings
Square tilings